Melanargia occitanica, the western marbled white, is a butterfly species belonging to the family Nymphalidae.

Distribution 
It can be found in North Africa and south western Europe.

Description 
The length of the forewings is 25–28 mm. Seitz - M. syllius Hbst. (= occitanica Esp.) (39 d, e). At once recognized by the veins and transverse lines forming a network of brown markings on the hindwing beneath, the large ocelli with their heavy whitish violet centres standing in between the stripes. The cell of the forewing above bears a black transverse line not far from its apex.

Biology 

The butterflies fly in one generation from April to June.

The larvae feed on various grasses.

References

Satyrinae of the Western Palearctic - Melanargia occitanica
Butterflies of Europe

occitanica
Butterflies of Africa
Butterflies of Europe
Lepidoptera of North Africa
Fauna of the Iberian Peninsula
Butterflies described in 1793